Peter Gwilym Collins (born 13 May 1958) is a British Roman Catholic prelate. On 11 October 2022 he was appointed by Pope Francis as Bishop of East Anglia, replacing Alan Hopes. He was consecrated Bishop and installed in the Diocese of East Anglia on 14 December 2022.

Peter Gwilym Collins was born on 13 May 1958 in Tredegar, in the Archdiocese of Cardiff. He was ordained a priest on 14 July 1984 for the same Archdiocese. He attended the English College of Valladolid in Spain and obtained a Licentiate in Dogmatic Theology at the Comillas Pontifical University in Madrid.

He has held the following positions: Parish Vicar at St David's Cathedral in Cardiff (1984-1989); Vice-Rector of the English College of Valladolid (1989-1994); Pastor of Chepstow, Caldicot and Magor (1995-2001); Dean and Administrator of St David's Cathedral in Cardiff (2001-2019).

From 2019 he served as parish priest of Saint Mary of the Angels and Holy Family in Cardiff, diocesan representative for Safeguarding, President of the Diocesan Commission for Education and President of the Presbyteral Council. He was also a member of the Cathedral Chapter of the Archdiocese of Cardiff.

References

External links

1958 births
Living people
21st-century Roman Catholic bishops in the United Kingdom
People from Tredegar
20th-century Welsh clergy
21st-century Welsh clergy
Clergy from Cardiff
Welsh Roman Catholic priests
Roman Catholic bishops of East Anglia